William Dyess may refer to:
 William E. Dyess (1916–1943), United States Army Air Forces officer
 William J. Dyess (1929—1996), American diplomat